Year 1354 (MCCCLIV) was a common year starting on Wednesday (link will display the full calendar) of the Julian calendar.

Events 
 January–December 
 Early in the year – Ibn Battuta returns from his travels at the command of Abu Inan Faris, sultan of Morocco, who appoints a scribe to write an account of the adventures.
 February 12 –  The Treaty of Stralsund settles border disputes between the duchies of Mecklenburg and Pomerania.
 March 2 –  The Gallipoli earthquake occurs, followed within a month by Turkish capture and settlement, the Fall of Gallipoli.
 October 8 – Cola di Rienzo, self-proclaimed "tribune" of Rome, is killed by an angry mob.
 December 10 – The reign of John VI Kantakouzenos as Byzantine Emperor is ended, after John V Palaiologos retakes Constantinople and is restored as sole emperor.

 Date unknown 
 After 24 years of struggling for independence, since the Battle of Posada (1330), won against Hungarians by his father, Nicholas Alexander of Wallachia becomes vassal to Hungarian king Louis I.
 The Ottoman Turks capture the city of Didymoteicho from the Byzantine Empire.
 Sahab-ud-Din becomes Sultan of Kashmir.
 Assassins strike down Sultan Hassan, and his body is never returned.

Births 
 Constance of Castile, wife of John of Gaunt (d. 1394)
 Denis, Lord of Cifuentes, infante of Portugal (d. c.1397)
 Alonso Enríquez, Spanish nobleman (d. 1429)
 Frederick III, Count of Moers, German nobleman (d. 1417)
 Gilbert de Greenlaw, Scottish bishop (d. 1421)
 Jean de Grouchy, Norman knight (k. 1435)
 Margaret of Joinville, French noblewoman (d. 1418)
 Thomas de Morley, 4th Baron Morley, English nobleman (d. 1416)
 Eric IV, Duke of Saxe-Lauenburg (d. 1411/12)
 Roger de Scales, 4th Baron Scales, English nobleman (d. 1387)
 Catherine of Vendôme, French noblewoman (d. 1412)
 Violante Visconti, Italian noblewoman (d. 1386)
 Walram IV, Count of Nassau-Idstein, German nobleman (d. 1393)

Deaths

January–March 
 January 8 – Charles de La Cerda (b. 1327)
 January 16 – Joanna of Châtillon, Duchess of Athens (b. c. 1285)

April–June 
 June 1 – Kitabatake Chikafusa (b. 1293)

July–September 
 August 9 – Stephen, Duke of Slavonia, Hungarian prince (b. 1332)
 September 7 – Andrea Dandolo, doge of Venice (b. 1306)

October–December 
 October 5 – Giovanni Visconti, Italian Roman Catholic cardinal (b. 1290)
 October 8 – Cola di Rienzo, Roman tribune (b. c. 1313)
 October 19 – Yusuf I, Sultan of Granada (b. 1318)

 date unknown – Wu Zhen, Chinese painter (b. 1280)

References